An uncoupler or uncoupling agent is a molecule that disrupts oxidative phosphorylation in prokaryotes and mitochondria or photophosphorylation in chloroplasts and cyanobacteria by dissociating the reactions of ATP synthesis from the electron transport chain. The result is that the cell or mitochondrion expends energy to generate a proton-motive force, but the proton-motive force is dissipated before the ATP synthase can recapture this energy and use it to make ATP. Uncouplers are capable of transporting protons through mitochondrial and lipid membranes.

Description

Classical uncouplers have five properties:

 the complete release of respiratory control
 the substitution of all coupled processes (ATP synthesis, transhydrogenation, reverse electron flow, active transport of cations, etc.) by a cyclic proton transport mediated by the uncoupler
 the elimination of all protonic and cationic gradients generated across the mitochondrial or prokaryotic membrane
 no discrimination in these actions between one coupling site and another
 no discrimination between coupled processes driven by electron transfer and coupled processes driven by ATP hydrolysis

Pseudo-uncouplers show one or more of these properties, but not all, and thus must be combined with one or more other pseudo-uncouplers to achieve full uncoupling.

Classical uncouplers
The following compounds are known to be classical uncouplers:
 2,4-dinitrophenol (DNP)
 2,5-dinitrophenol
 1799 (α,α′-bis(hexafluoracetonyl)acetone)
 BAM15, N5,N6-bis(2-fluorophenyl)-[1,2,5]oxadiazolo[3,4-b]pyrazine-5,6-diamine
 2-tert-butyl-4,6-dinitrophenol (Dinoterb)
 6-sec-butyl-2,4-dinitrophenol (Dinoseb)
 C4R1 (a short-chain alkyl derivative of rhodamine 19)
 Carbonyl cyanide phenylhydrazone (CCP)
 Carbonyl cyanide m-chlorophenyl hydrazone (CCCP)
 Carbonyl cyanide-p-trifluoromethoxyphenyl hydrazone (FCCP)
 CDE (produced by Verbesina)
 CZ5
 Desaspidin
 Dicoumarol
 Dinitro-ortho-cresol (DNOC)
 Ellipticine
 Endosidin 9 (ES9)
 Flufenamic acid
 Niclosamide ethanolamine (NEN)
 Ppc-1 (a secondary metabolite produced by Polysphondylium pseudocandidum)
 Pentachlorophenol (PCP)
 Perfluorotriethylcarbinol
 S-13 (5-chloro-3-t-butyl-2′-chloro-4′-nitrosalicylanilide)
 SF 6847 (3,5-di-t-butyl-4-hydroxybenzylidinemalononitrile)
 TTFB (4,5,6,7-tetrachloro-2-trifluoromethylbenzimidazole)
 Tyrphostin A9 (SF-6847) (AG17)
 (+)-usnic acid
 XCT-790
 mitoFluo (10-[2-(3-hydroxy-6-oxo-xanthen-9-yl)benzoyl]oxydecyl-triphenyl-phosphonium bromide)
 Triclosan (Trichloro-2'-hydroxydiphenyl ether)
 Pyrrolomycin C (produced by Genus Streptomyces)
 Salicylic acid (if taken in extreme excess)

Pseudo-uncouplers
The following compounds are known to be pseudo-uncouplers:
 Azide
 Biguanides
 Bupivacaine
 Calcimycin (A23187)
 Dodecyltriphenylphosphonium (C12TPP)
 Lasalocid (X537A)
 Long-chain fatty acids, such as linoleic acid
 MitoQ10
 Nigericin
 Picric acid (2,4,6-trinitrophenol)
 Sodium tetraphenylborate
 SR4 (1,3-bis(dichlorophenyl)urea 13)
 Tetraphenylphosphonium chloride
 Valinomycin
 Arsenate

See also
 Uncoupling protein
 Mitochondrial toxicity

Notes

References

External links 
 

Uncoupling agents
Ionophores
Respiratory toxins